Pit 7 Dam is a run-of-the-river hydroelectric dam across the Pit River in northern California. The dam is owned by the Pacific Gas and Electric Company.

See also

List of dams and reservoirs in California
List of lakes in California

References

Dams in California
Dams on the Pit River
Arch-gravity dams
Buildings and structures in Shasta County, California
Hydroelectric power plants in California
Run-of-the-river power stations
Pacific Gas and Electric Company dams
Dams completed in 1965
Energy infrastructure completed in 1965
1965 establishments in California